As Above, So Below is the second and final full-length studio album by American thrash metal band Forced Entry. It was released on June 14, 1991, on Relativity Records, and re-issued in 2009 on Lost and Found Records. Music videos for "Macrocosm, Microcosm" and "Never A Know, But the No" were produced, the latter of which featured a cameo by members of Alice in Chains.

As Above, So Below is considered a classic album of the early 1990s thrash metal scene. The tones and directions of this album are considerably more diverse than the straightforward thrash of Uncertain Future, consisting of elements of progressive, punk and groove metal, with more technical song structures and tempo changes, as well as a power ballad ("Never a Know, But the No").

As of 2020, the album is no longer in print.

Reception

AllMusic's Jason Anderson awarded the album three stars out of five, saying, "Musically similar to their earlier efforts, this 1991 Combat/Relativity records release boasts a punchier sound and slightly more technical material than prior efforts by the band. Brad Hull's guitar work is especially impressive, and his bandmates Collin Mattson (drums) and Tony Benjamins (bass and vocals) also deliver some creative and powerful performances of their own."

Track listing

Credits
 Tony Benjamins – vocals, bass
 Brad Hull – guitar, backing vocals, lead vocals on track 4
 Colin Mattson – drums

References

Forced Entry (band) albums
1991 albums
Relativity Records albums